Eois insignata is a moth in the  family Geometridae. It is found in Venezuela and Honduras.

References

Moths described in 1861
Eois
Moths of Central America
Moths of South America